The tufted-tailed spiny tree-rat or furtive spiny tree-rat (Mesomys occultus) is a spiny rat species known from Amazonas, northwestern Brazil, where it is found in tropical rainforest. The species is arboreal.

References

Mesomys
Mammals described in 2000